Rajan Pur Kalan ,  is a Union Council and a small town of Tehsil Rahim Yar Khan and Rahim Yar Khan District in the far southwestern part of Punjab, Pakistan. It is also known as Rajan Pur Dahiran Wali or Chooti (Small) Rajan Pur. This town lies south of the Indus River and on the bank of Dallas Canal.

Mouza
Union Council Rajan Pur Kalan is further divided into four Mouzas
 Rajan Pur Kalan
 Rajan Pur Khurd
 Qaisar Chohan
 Fazal Abad

Basic facilities
 Many government schools, private schools, and Madaris
 Rural health center
 Vocational training institute By TEVTA Punjab
 Union council office

Nearby famous places or villages
Kot Karam Khan
 Degi Bangla
 Head Degi
 Hassan Abad
 Mud Manthar
 Qaisar Chohan
 Badli Sharif
 Chak Sikhaan
 Deera Musheer
 Imam Nagar
 Adda Muhammad Pur
 Motorway  Rahim Yar Khan Interchange

See also
Kot Karam Khan
Abou Bakar Ashraf
Bhong Masjid
Patan minara

References

Rahim Yar Khan District
Cities in Punjab (Pakistan)